Emus Can't Walk Backwards is the sequel to Robert Anwood's 2006 book Bears Can't Run Downhill. As with the first book, it investigates so-called pub facts.

External links
Page about Emus Can't Walk Backwards on author's official site

2007 non-fiction books
Trivia books
Ebury Publishing books